Gary Burton & Keith Jarrett is an album by vibraphonist Gary Burton and pianist Keith Jarrett with guitarist Sam Brown, bassist Steve Swallow and drummer Bill Goodwin, recorded in 1970 and released on the Atlantic label in 1971. Jarrett also plays soprano saxophone on this recording.

Reception 
The Allmusic review by Scott Yanow stated: "Elements of pop music, rock, country and the jazz avant-garde are used in the mixture of styles and the results are quite logical".

Original LP track listing 
 "Grow Your Own" (Keith Jarrett) - 4:54
 "Moonchild/In Your Quiet Place" (Jarrett) - 7:23
 "Como en Vietnam" (Steve Swallow) - 7:04
 "Fortune Smiles" (Jarrett) - 8:31
 "The Raven Speaks" (Jarrett) - 8:18

 Tracks 1-5 recorded at A&R Studios, New York on July 23, 1970.

CD bonus tracks (Throb) 
The album is paired with Gary Burton's earlier album Throb on the Rhino CD (R2 71594 (US)/8122-71594-2 (Germany) 1994 reissue.

  "Henniger Flats" (David Pritchard) - 4:24
 "Turn Of The Century" (Michael Gibbs) - 5:05
 "Chickens" (Steve Swallow) - 2:27
 "Arise Her Eyes" (Swallow) - 3:48
 "Prime Time" (Jerry Hahn) - 4:03
 "Throb" (Michael Gibbs)- 4:31
 "Doin' The Pig" (Swallow) - 3:45
 "Triple Portrait" (Gibbs) - 4:26
 "Some Echoes" (Swallow) - 6:59

 Tracks 6-14 recorded at Atlantic Studios, New York on June 2–5, 1969.

Personnel     
 Keith Jarrett – piano, electric piano, soprano saxophone
 Gary Burton - vibraphone
 Sam Brown - guitar
 Steve Swallow - bass
 Bill Goodwin - drums

References 

Atlantic Records albums
Keith Jarrett albums
Gary Burton albums
1971 albums
Albums produced by Joel Dorn
Collaborative albums